From 14 to 19 February 2022, a European windstorm struck the United Kingdom, Germany, Poland, The Netherlands, the Czech Republic, and Lithuania. The storm was named Storm Dudley by the UK Met Office on February 14, 2022. The storm caused 225,000 people to lose power, killed nine people, and spawned 24 tornadoes across Europe. The storm occurred just before the stronger and more impactful Storm Eunice, which caused over 3.1 million power outages, 17 fatalities, and over €1.83 billion in damage.

Meteorological history 
Storm Dudley, along with Storm Eunice and Storm Franklin, formed by a sting jet, a narrow band of winds that can create narrow and intense winds in a small area. It was also partly due to a large polar vortex in the Arctic that formed these storms. The storm trio isn't particularly rare for the area, as it has happened before.

Preparations and impacts

United Kingdom 
The United Kingdom saw one fatality due to Storm Dudley. The Environment Agency issued 38 flood alerts for the UK. In Yorkshire, a falling power line electrocuted 13 dogs. During the cleanup of Storm Dudley, Storm Eunice struck, further compounding the damage.

Germany 
The Elbe River flowed  higher than normal, and a ferry had its windows shattered. The storm also spawned one tornado in Germany, in Brandenburg, which was rated as an F1/T3 tornado.

Poland 
The storm produced a very intense squall line of severe thunderstorms that moved through Poland, producing damaging straight-line winds and numerous embedded tornadoes. A man in Western Poland near Gorzów Wielkopolski died when a tree fell on his car. Another tornado in Sierosław injured one, and an F2 tornado in Wójcice injured two. Overall, 23 tornadoes were confirmed in Poland.

Lithuania 
Storm Dudley killed two people in Lithuania due to strong winds.

Tornado outbreak

Highest wind gust per country

See also 
Storm Eunice – impacted similar areas two days later

References 

2022 disasters in Europe
2022 meteorology
February 2022 events in Europe
European windstorms
Winter weather events in the United Kingdom